Diadème was an 86-gun Bucentaure-class 80-gun ship of the line of the French Navy, designed by Jacques-Noël Sané.

Commissioned in Lorient in January 1812, Diadème was disarmed at the Bourbon Restoration. She had major refits in 1822 and 1833, and was reactivated in 1826 to join the squadron of the Mediterranean.

From 1856, she was used as a barracks hulk.

References
 Roche, Jean-Michel, Dictionnaire des Bâtiments de la flotte de guerre française de Colbert à nos jours, tome I

Ships of the line of the French Navy
Ships built in France
Bucentaure-class ships of the line
1811 ships